The Central Spiritual Board of Buddhists of the USSR (TsDUB) was the authorized organization for Buddhists in the Soviet Union.

The organization was founded at a congress of Buddhist believers on May 21–23, 1946 in Ulan-Ude, Buryat-Mongol ASSR. Their "Law of Spiritual Administration of Buddhists and a Regulation for Buddhist Clergy of the USSR", making it imperative for Buddhists to honor the worker's fatherland and put its interests on par with their faith.

The Chairman of the new organization was given the title Bandido Khambo Lama, and the headquarters was at a new temple located near Ulan-Ude, Khambin sume, now known as Ivolginsky datsan. Soon a second temple was built, the Agin datsan in Chita. A permanent office was established in Moscow, which mainly dealt with external relations.

A congress of clergy and laity met quadrennially to elect members of the Board.

TsDUB joined the International Brotherhood of Buddhists in 1956 and the Asian Buddhist Conference for Peace in 1969. The latter was an organization of Buddhists from Soviet dominated countries.

Leaders 

Chairmen of this group held the title Bandido Khambo-Lama. This post was held by the following:

L.N. Darmaev (1946-1956)
Eshi Dorzhi Sharapov (1956-1963)
Zhambal Gomboev (1963-1983)
Munko Tsybikov

References

See also 
Buddhist Sangha of Vietnam
Buddhist Association of China
Korea Buddhists Federation

Religious organizations established in 1946
Buddhism in the Soviet Union
Buddhist organizations in Asia
Buddhist organizations in Europe